Lee Dong-jun (born Daniel Sandrin; 27 January 1980) is an American-born South Korean basketball player.

Career
Lee began his basketball career playing for the University of Portland in the 1998–1999 season, appearing in eight games and scoring an average of 1 points. He transferred to Seattle Pacific University in 2000. After his graduation, he went on to play on professional teams in Luxembourg and Germany before coming to South Korea in 2006.

In South Korea, Lee joined Yonsei University's team in March 2006. Lee's participation in university basketball was controversial because he was not a South Korean citizen and he had previously played in professional leagues in Europe. Even after he naturalised, Korea University continued to object to his participation due to his professional experience; after he was ruled ineligible, a physical altercation broke out at a September 2006 match between Yonsei University and Korea University. Coming to South Korea was a difficult adjustment for Lee in terms of culture and language. Philippine Olympic Committee president Monico Puentevella stated in media interviews that Sandrin had told him "he couldn’t relate with the Koreans because they hardly speak English … he felt more comfortable with our team. Nevertheless, Lee stated that he relished the opportunity to live in the country and learn more about his roots.

Lee would go on to play professionally in the Korean Basketball League for the Daegu Orions. He later moved to the Seoul Samsung Thunders. In January 2013 he and elder brother Lee Seung-jun were booked on assault charges in Mapo District, leading to controversy over whether they should be permitted to play in the then-ongoing KBL All-Star Games.

On 21 November 2016, it was announced that Lee would serve as one of two Alab Pilipinas' world imports together with his brother Lee Seung-jun.

Personal life
Lee was born into a basketball family: his father was an avid player, and taught the game to Lee's older brother and then to Lee himself. He graduated from Bothell High School in 1998 before going on to the University of Portland and then Seattle Pacific University. He naturalised as a South Korean citizen in June 2006, relinquishing his U.S. citizenship in the process. His elder brother Eric Sandrin followed him to South Korea and in 2009 also naturalised as a South Korean citizen, changing his name to Lee Seung-jun.

See also
List of former United States citizens who relinquished their nationality

References

External links
  
  Profile at KBL.or.kr

1980 births
Living people
American emigrants to South Korea
Forwards (basketball)
Goyang Carrot Jumpers players
Korean Basketball League players
People with acquired South Korean citizenship
Former United States citizens
San Miguel Alab Pilipinas players
Seattle Pacific University alumni
Seoul Samsung Thunders players
South Korean expatriate sportspeople in the Philippines
South Korean expatriate sportspeople in France
South Korean men's basketball players
South Korean people of American descent
University of Portland alumni